Henry Czerny (born February 8, 1959) is a Canadian stage, film, and television actor. He is known for his roles in the films The Boys of St. Vincent, Mission: Impossible, Clear and Present Danger, The Ice Storm, The Exorcism of Emily Rose, Fido, Remember, and Ready or Not and has appeared in numerous television programs in both guest and starring roles, including a regular role as Conrad Grayson on the ABC primetime soap opera Revenge. 

Czerny has received the Theatre World Award and two Gemini Awards, and was nominated for the Canadian Screen Award for Best Supporting Actor for his performance in The Other Half.

Early life and education 
Czerny was born on 8 February 1959 in Toronto, Ontario, Canada, the youngest of three children to Polish Canadian parents. The word "czerny" means "black" in several Slavic languages. His father worked as a welder, and his mother worked in a bakery.

Czerny attended York University in Toronto.

Acting career 
Czerny received formal training at the National Theatre School in Montreal. After graduating in 1982, he went on to perform onstage across Canada, from Ottawa's National Arts Centre to Edmonton's Citadel Theatre and the Stratford Festival.

By the late 1980s, he had established himself as a seasoned veteran of Canadian theatre—a long way from Lucky Larry, his first role. Czerny got his start acting in musicals at Humberside Collegiate Institute in Toronto, under the direction of Janet Keele. Czerny played the role of the husband of the title character in Choices of the Heart: The Margaret Sanger Story.

He had prominent roles in The Boys of St. Vincent, Clear and Present Danger, The Ice Storm and The Michelle Apartments. In the 2006 comedy The Pink Panther, he played the main antagonist "Yuri the Trainer who Trains".

He appeared as Lieutenant Brooks in "Jackpot", a 2005 episode of CSI: Crime Scene Investigation. In Conversations with God, about the true story of Neale Donald Walsch, Czerny plays Walsch. In 2007, he appeared in the Showtime series The Tudors, playing the Duke of Norfolk. He appeared in the Canadian television show Flashpoint in 2008 and the American science fiction drama Falling Skies in 2011. Czerny co-starred with Sigourney Weaver in the 2009 Lifetime movie Prayers for Bobby.

In 2011, Czerny was cast opposite Madeleine Stowe, as the powerful patriarch Conrad Grayson, a series regular role, in ABC soap-type series Revenge. His character was stabbed at the end of season 3 and in the first episode of the fourth season it was revealed he had died. He later returned to the series in unseen flashback sequences in one season 4 episode. In 2016, Czerny was cast in the ABC thriller series Quantico for the recurring role of CIA director Matthew Keyes.

He played Eugene Kittridge in the 1996 Mission: Impossible film, and is to return in the role in Mission: Impossible – Dead Reckoning Part One.

Czerny is widely regarded as a character actor, often playing villainous, authoritative, or bureaucratic characters.

Personal life 
Czerny is married to Claudine Cassidy and they have a son. Before his marriage, he dated American actress Dana Delany.

Besides acting, his interests include photography, travel, crafting and carpentry.

Filmography

Film

Television

Video games

References

External links 

1959 births
Living people
Male actors from Toronto
Canadian male film actors
Canadian male stage actors
Canadian male television actors
Canadian people of Polish descent
Canadian Screen Award winners
Theatre World Award winners